NATO (the North Atlantic Treaty Organization) maintains foreign relations with many non-member countries across the globe. NATO runs a number of programs which provide a framework for the partnerships between itself and these non-member nations, typically based on that country's location. These include the Euro-Atlantic Partnership Council and the Partnership for Peace.

Europe

Six EU member states, all who have declared their non-alignment with military alliances, are not NATO members: Austria, Cyprus, Finland, Ireland, Malta, and Sweden. Additionally, Switzerland, which is surrounded by the EU, has also maintained its neutrality by remaining a non-EU-member. All these countries except Cyprus have joined the Partnership for Peace programme, while Sweden and Finland signed a specific host country support agreement with NATO in 2014. NATO also reportedly has diplomatic relations with the 5 European microstates: Andorra, Liechtenstein, Monaco, San Marino, and Vatican City. These microstates (which are neutral, surrounded by NATO members, and have only nominal militaries) are part of the OSCE but do not participate in NATO's PfP.

Armenia

Armenia has maintained positive relations with NATO members and has signed up for the Partnership for Peace programme, the Euro-Atlantic Partnership Council and the Individual Partnership Action Plan. However, Armenia is unlikely to join NATO as its policies often align it closer with Russia, and it remains a member of the Commonwealth of Independent States and the Collective Security Treaty Organization. Armenia pulled out of its participation in NATO military exercises in Georgia on 8 May 2009, because of NATO's Secretary-General's alleged support of Azerbaijan, possibly making it even less likely that Armenia would eventually join NATO. Armenia does however participate in certain NATO peacekeeping operations. Armenia deploys approximately 130 soldiers in Afghanistan, as part of the NATO-led International Security Assistance Force (ISAF). They are serving under German command protecting an airport in Konduz.

Austria

Azerbaijan

Azerbaijan was originally a member of the Collective Security Treaty Organization, but has since committed to a policy of neutrality in 1999. While President Ilham Aliyev has generally supported non-belligerency (though not neutrality due to the unresolved conflict with Armenia over Nagorno-Karabakh) since his rise to power in 2003, Azerbaijan has hosted NATO military exercises and high-profile meetings in 2009. Azerbaijan made its policy of not being aligned with a geopolitical/military structure official when it became a full member of the Non-Aligned Movement in 2011.

The unresolved Nagorno-Karabakh conflict would present a major roadblock to Azerbaijani membership of NATO, with concerns that this would lead to stronger Russian support of Armenia in the dispute.

Bosnia and Herzegovina

Cyprus

Cyprus is the only EU member state that is neither a NATO member state nor a member of the PfP program. The Parliament of Cyprus voted in February 2011 to apply for membership in the program, but President Demetris Christofias vetoed the decision as it would hamper his attempts to negotiate an end to the Cyprus dispute and demilitarize the island. Turkey, a full member of NATO, is likely to veto any attempt by Cyprus to engage with NATO until the dispute is resolved. The winner of Cyprus' presidential election in February 2013, Nicos Anastasiades, stated that he intended to apply for membership in the PfP program soon after taking over. Foreign minister Nicos Christodoulides dismissed Cypriot membership of NATO or Partnership for Peace, preferring to keep Cyprus’ foreign and defence affairs within the framework of the European Union.

Finland

Finland participates in nearly all sub-areas of the Partnership for Peace programme, and has provided peacekeeping forces to both the Afghanistan and Kosovo missions. However, a 2005 poll indicated that the public was strongly against NATO membership. The possibility of Finland's membership in NATO was one of the most important issues debated in relation to the Finnish presidential election of 2006.

The main opposition candidate in the 2006 election, current president Sauli Niinistö of the National Coalition Party, supported Finland joining a "more European" NATO. Fellow right-winger Henrik Lax of the Swedish People's Party likewise supported the concept. On the other side, president Tarja Halonen of the Social Democratic Party opposed changing the status quo, as did most other candidates in the election. Her victory and re-election to the post of president put the issue of a NATO membership for Finland on hold for the duration of her term. Finland could however change its official position on NATO membership after the new EU treaty clarifies if there will be any new EU-level defence deal, but in the meantime Finnish Defence Forces are making technical preparations for membership, stating that it would increase Finland's security.

Other political figures of Finland who have weighed in with opinions include former President of Finland Martti Ahtisaari who has argued that Finland should join all the organizations supported by other Western democracies in order "to shrug off once and for all the burden of Finlandization". Another ex-president, Mauno Koivisto, opposed the idea, arguing that NATO membership would ruin Finland's relations with Russia. Finland has received some very critical feedback from Russia for even considering the possibility of joining NATO, with a 2009 study suggesting this could have repercussions for Russia's relations with the EU and NATO as a whole. In October 2009, Finnish Prime Minister Matti Vanhanen reiterated that Finland had no plans to join NATO, and stated that the main lesson of the 2008 South Ossetia war was the need for closer ties to Russia. In September 2014, Finland signed an agreement with NATO that allows NATO and Finland to hold joint exercises on Finnish soil and permits assistance from NATO members in situations such as "disasters, disruptions, and threats to security." As such, Finland (and Sweden) participated in the 2015 NATO-led Arctic Challenge Exercise.

Polling conducted following the 2022 Russian invasion of Ukraine, 53% of respondents were in favour of Finnish membership of the Alliance, with 28% against and 19% undecided. If Sweden were also to join NATO, the figure goes up to 66% in favor and the opposition drops to 20%.

Following talks between NATO's foreign ministers which Finland and Sweden attended in April 2022, US officials estimated that Finland would apply for NATO membership in June. On 12 May 2022, Finnish president Sauli Niinistö and prime minister Sanna Marin announced in a joint press conference that Finland would seek NATO membership "without delay". Both Finland and Sweden submitted their applications to join NATO on 18 May 2022.

Ireland

Ireland has been a member of NATO's Partnership for Peace (PfP) programme since 1999, and is a member of the alliance's Euro-Atlantic Partnership Council (EAPC), but has never officially applied to join as a full NATO member due to its traditional policy of military neutrality. Ireland participates in the PfP Planning and Review Process (PARP), which aims to increase the interoperability of the Irish military, the Defence Forces, with other NATO member states and bring them into line with accepted international standards so as to successfully deploy with other professional military forces on peacekeeping operations overseas.

Irish government policy for the deployment of troops to NATO-led missions requires that the missions be mandated by the United Nations (UN Security Council resolution or UN General Assembly resolution), cabinet-backed and approved by Dáil Éireann (the Irish parliament). This is known as Ireland's "triple lock". Ireland supplied a limited number of troops to the NATO-led International Security Assistance Force (ISAF) in Afghanistan (2001-2014) and supports the ongoing NATO-led Kosovo Force (KFOR), as these were sanctioned by UNSC resolutions.

Public opinion in Ireland continues to favour a policy of neutrality in armed conflicts, and currently no major political party fully supports ascension into NATO. There has been, and continues to be, a number of politicians who support Ireland joining NATO, mainly within the centre-right Fine Gael party, but the majority of politicians still do not. It is widely understood that a referendum would have to be held before any changes could be made to neutrality or to joining NATO. Former Secretary General of NATO Anders Fogh Rasmussen said during a visit to the country in 2013 that the "door is open" for Ireland to join NATO at any time.

Kosovo
Kosovo submitted an application to join the PfP program in July 2012, though its lack of recognition by four NATO member states could impede its accession.

Malta

Moldova

Moldova does not currently have plans to join NATO. It has participated in the Partnership for Peace programme and the Individual Partnership Action Plan. The former communist government was seen as more allied with Russia and is already a member of the Commonwealth of Independent States. In April 2009 Moldova announced it would not participate in the June NATO military exercises. The new ruling party, the Alliance for European Integration, elected in the July 2009 Moldovan parliamentary election, declined to take any action to either move it toward membership, or withdraw from the Commonwealth of Independent States, and denied plans to do either. Moldova also has an ongoing internal conflict with the territory of Transnistria.

Russia

In April 2009, the Polish Foreign Minister, Radosław Sikorski, suggested including Russia in NATO. In March 2010 this suggestion was repeated in an open letter co-written by German defense experts General Klaus Naumann, Frank Elbe, Ulrich Weisser, and former German Defense Minister Volker Rühe. In the letter it was suggested that Russia was needed in the wake of an emerging multi-polar world in order for NATO to counterbalance emerging Asian powers. However Russian leadership has made it clear that Russia does not plan to join the alliance, preferring to keep cooperation on a lower level. The Russian envoy to NATO, Dmitry Rogozin, is quoted as saying "Great powers don't join coalitions, they create coalitions. Russia considers itself a great power," although he said that Russia did not rule out membership at some point in the future.

Serbia

NATO historically fought Bosnian-Serbian forces during the Bosnia war and intervened in 1999 in the Kosovo War by bombing targets in Serbia (then part of FR Yugoslavia). After the overthrow of President Slobodan Milošević, Serbia wanted to improve its relations with NATO. However, a future membership in the military alliance remained highly controversial, because among political parties and large sections of society there were still resentments due to NATO bombing of Yugoslavia in 1999. In the years under Prime Minister Zoran Đinđić the country (then Serbia and Montenegro) did not rule out joining NATO. But after Đinđić's assassination in 2003, Belgrade increasingly started preferring a course of military neutrality (officially declared in 2007).

The subsequent independence of Montenegro and Kosovo have strained relations between Serbia and NATO. Serbia however joined the Partnership for Peace programme during the 2006 Riga Summit. While this programme is sometimes the first step towards full NATO membership, it is uncertain whether Serbia perceives it as signaling an intent to join the alliance.

Following NATO's open support to Kosovo's declaration of independence in January 2008, support for NATO integration greatly dropped. An earlier poll in September 2007 had showed that 28% of Serbian citizens supported NATO membership, with 58% supporting the Partnership for Peace. The Democratic Party abandoned its pro-NATO attitude, claiming the Partnership for Peace is enough.

Although current Serbian priorities do not include NATO membership, the Alliance has offered Serbia an invitation to enter the intensified dialogue programme whenever the country is ready. On 1 October 2008, Serbian Defence Minister Dragan Šutanovac signed the Information Exchange Agreement with the NATO, one of the prerequisites for fuller membership in the Partnership for Peace programme.

In 2015, Serbia implemented its first Individual Partnership Action Plan with NATO, regularly participates in its military maneuvers and hosted a joint civil protection exercise with NATO in 2018.

Sweden

In 1949 Sweden chose not to join NATO and declared a security policy aiming for non-alignment in peace and neutrality in war. Sweden joined Partnership for Peace in 1994. These ideological divides were visible again in November 2006 when Sweden could either buy two new transport planes or join NATO's plane pool, and in December 2006, when Sweden was invited to join the NATO Response Force. While the governing parties in Sweden have opposed membership, they have participated in NATO-led missions in Bosnia (IFOR and SFOR), Kosovo (KFOR), Afghanistan (ISAF) and Libya (Operation Unified Protector).

The Swedish left wing, including the Social Democratic party, the Green party and the Left party have historically remained in favor of non-alignment, along with the nationalist Sweden Democrats. The right wing, including the Moderate Party, the Centre party, the conservative Christian Democrats and the Liberal party make up the Swedish parties with representation in the parliament today that are in favor of NATO membership. Former Prime Minister Fredrik Reinfeldt stated on 18 September 2007 that a Swedish membership in NATO would require a "very wide" majority in Parliament, including the Social Democrats, and coordination with Finland. Sweden signed in 2014, and ratified in 2016, a host country agreement with NATO allowing for NATO forces to conduct joint training exercises on Swedish soil and for NATO member states' forces to be deployed in Sweden in response to threats to Sweden's national security. In October 2014, an opinion poll found for the first time more Swedes in favor of NATO membership (37%) than opposed (36%).

If the situation in and around the Baltic countries were to escalate, Swedish NATO membership, possibly together with Finland, would reduce barriers to NATO intervention in the region. NATO reported in 2015 that Russia simulated a nuclear attack on Sweden in 2013. The Swedish government questioned Sweden's neutral status after the Russian intervention in Ukraine. Russian foreign minister Sergey Lavrov threatened in 2016 to "take necessary measures" to prevent Swedish NATO membership. According to a poll conducted by Sifo in June 2016, more Swedes are against a Swedish NATO membership than in favour of one. A government-sponsored report on the future of Sweden's NATO membership was released in September 2016. The nationalist Sweden Democrats revised their stance in April 2022 and announced that they would support Swedish membership in NATO if Finland also joins. Around the same time, the Social Democrats announced that they would be "initiating a dialogue" internally to discuss NATO membership for a second time in 6 months. The first time, the party decided to oppose membership.

Following talks between NATO's foreign ministers which Finland and Sweden attended in April 2022, US officials estimated that Sweden would follow Finland in filing a membership application. Both Sweden and Finland submitted their applications to join NATO on 18 May 2022.

Switzerland

Ukraine

At the beginning of 2008, the Ukrainian President, Prime Minister and head of parliament sent an official letter to apply for the Membership Action Plan. The idea of Ukrainian membership in NATO has gained support from a number of NATO leaders. At the 2008 Bucharest summit, NATO Secretary General Jaap de Hoop Scheffer declared in a press conference that Georgia and Ukraine would eventually join NATO. Within the NATO-Ukraine working commission, NATO officials reassured Ukraine officials that they are willing to invite their country to join the Alliance. The Deputy Foreign Minister of Russia, Alexander Grushko, announced that NATO membership for Ukraine was not in Russia's best interests and wouldn't help the relations of the two countries.

According to numerous independent polls conducted between 2002 and the events of 2014, Ukrainian public opinion on NATO membership was split, with the majority of those polled against joining the military alliance and many identifying it as a threat. According to the FOM-Ukraine pollster, as of April 2009, 57% of Ukrainians polled were against joining the alliance, while 21% were in favor. A Gallup poll conducted in October 2008 showed that 45% associated NATO as a threat to their country, while only 15% associated it with protection. Ukrainian politicians such as Yuriy Yekhanurov and Yulia Tymoshenko stated Ukraine would not join NATO as long as the public continued opposing the move. In 2008 the Ukrainian government started an information campaign, aimed at informing the Ukrainian people about the consequences of membership.

The 2010 election returned Viktor Yanukovych as Ukrainian President and marked a turnaround in Ukraine's relations with NATO. In February 2010, he stated that Ukraine's relations with NATO were currently "well-defined", and that there was "no question of Ukraine joining NATO". He said the issue of Ukrainian membership of NATO might "emerge at some point, but we will not see it in the immediate future." While visiting Brussels in March 2010, he further stated that there would be no change to Ukraine's status as a member of the alliance's outreach program. He later reiterated during a trip to Moscow that Ukraine would remain a "European, non-aligned state." Then, on 3 June 2010 the Ukrainian parliament voted to exclude the goal of "integration into Euro-Atlantic security and NATO membership" from the country's national security strategy in a bill drafted by Yanukovych himself.

Amid the Euromaidan unrest, Yanukovych fled Ukraine in February 2014. The interim Yatsenyuk Government which came to power, initially said, with reference to the country's non-aligned status, that it had no plans to join NATO. However, following the Russian invasion of Ukraine and parliamentary elections in October 2014, the new government made joining NATO a priority. On 23 December 2014, the Ukrainian parliament renounced Ukraine's non-aligned status that "proved to be ineffective in guaranteeing Ukraine's security and protecting the country from external aggression and pressure". Ukraine and NATO have since held joint seminars and joint tactical and strategical exercises and operations.

Since the start of the 2014 Russian military intervention in Ukraine, public support for Ukrainian membership in NATO has risen greatly. Since June 2014 polls show that about 50% of those asked voice support for Ukrainian membership. By early 2022 (just before the Russian invasion of Ukraine began), support had risen further to 62% as Russia built up forces near the Ukrainian border. In March 2022, Volodymyr Zelenskyy, president of Ukraine, stated that he did not anticipate Ukraine joining NATO in the near future. However, in September 2022, he announced that Ukraine has applied for NATO membership under an accelerated procedure, following Russia's claimed annexation of Southeastern Ukraine.

Global NATO

In 2006, the then United States Ambassador to NATO Ivo H. Daalder together with James Goldgeier conceived the term "Global NATO". Subsequently, ideas for membership of various states were floated: Brazil, South Africa, Singapore, India, Israel, and most frequently of Australia, Japan, South Korea, New Zealand and Colombia. The idea is to transform the Cold War institution into a "Global alliance of democracies".

Australia
The issue of Australian NATO membership is often brought forward. Australia is even referred to as a "de facto member of NATO". Australia is referred to by NATO as one of their "partners across the globe", agreeing to work on crisis and conflict management, post-conflict situations, reconstruction and facilitating humanitarian assistance and disaster relief. NATO and Australia signed a joint political declaration in June 2012 followed by a signature of an Individual Partnership and Cooperation Programme in February of the next year.

General Knud Bartels, Chairman of the NATO Military Committee at the time, stressed the need for "substantial and practical cooperation, to learn from each other, share best practices and develop common standards because NATO and Australia have a strong partnership and are committed to enhancing their abilities of working together in order to better tackle future global challenges".

Colombia
Colombia is NATO's latest partner and Colombia has access to the full range of cooperative activities NATO offers to partners. NATO and Colombia have concluded a partnership agreement with a view to strengthening dialogue and cooperation to address shared security challenges. A close strategic ally and trade partner of NATO members the U.S. and Spain, Colombia has been a strong supporter of NATO and its actions. In 2009, the Colombian Government asked to be part of the ISAF and work with the Spanish contingent in mine detection operations, but this didn't materialize due to the internal conflict that Colombia faced. In March 2011, Colombia voted in favor of United Nations Security Council Resolution 1973, thus officially allowing for NATO military intervention in the Libyan Civil War. In April 2012, Colombia was amended into the NATO ATP-56(B) which gave Colombia "associate" status and to re-establish air-to-air fueling capabilities with NATO member countries.

On 4 June 2013, Colombian President Juan Manuel Santos announced that Colombia will be signing a Cooperation Agreement with NATO in hopes of eventually joining the military alliance. Santos also stated that: "If we can achieve peace, the army will be in a place where it will be able to distinguish itself internationally as well. We are already doing it on many fronts." In response, the U.S. government noted, "Our goal is certainly to support Colombia as being a capable and strong member of lots of different international organizations, and that might well include NATO. Ultimately this is a decision that all of the NATO members would have to make."

However, on the same day, a Colombian and NATO official both objected to NATO membership for Colombia. Defense Minister Juan Carlos Pinzon stated his country merely wished to sign a cooperation deal with NATO, and a NATO official noted that, "There is no immediate plan for establishing a formal partnership between the alliance and Colombia, but we are exploring the possibility of carrying out specific activities together...and we are currently developing a security of information agreement which would allow the exchange of classified information between the alliance and Colombia."

On the 10th of March 2022, in the context of the 2022 Russian invasion of Ukraine and amidst talks of new oil negotiations with Venezuela, US President Joe Biden announced Colombia had been designated Major Non-NATO Ally, in a bilateral meeting at the White House.

India
In September 2011, The NATO alliance invited India to be a partner in its ballistic missile defence (BMD). According to the reports a top NATO official stated addressing Indian representatives, "You have a missile threat that confronts you. We have a missile threat that confronts us. It's a different one, but our ability to defend against it could be the same. We have cooperation on those kind of issues. [..]Democracies face challenges that are common. We need to work together and resolve. We need to cooperate, because individually we cannot deal with such threats. It is better to deal with such issues commonly than deal with them individually." V. K. Saraswat, the architect of Indian BMD program, subsequently informed, "We are analysing the report. It is under consideration."

Then-U.S. NATO Ambassador Ivo H. Daalder has suggested that India should turn away from its non-aligned role and join NATO. A Voice of Russia analysis quoted Robert Pshel, head of NATO's Information Office in Moscow as saying "I agree with Mr Daalder that many modern threats are global, and tackling them without emerging powers like India is hardly possible." Daalder further stated, "The dialogue should be on how India's concept of its own security and of international security fits in with NATO's concept of international security and how NATO as an actor and India as a country can work together to promote security."

The United States and India have already studied the possibility of a joint missile defence system, although former Defence Secretary Robert Gates stated that "talks were only in their early stages." Boris Volkonsky of the Russian Strategic Research Institute was quoted as saying, "an ally like India would strengthen Washington's hand in South and Southwest Asia and other world areas." A Voice of Russia analysis speculated on an additional, ulterior motive from a shared Indian and American fear of the "rising dragon of China".

And while most members of the Indian strategic community readily admit that NATO's Afghanistan mission coincides with India's own strategic interest in stabilising that country, they do not necessarily conclude from this that India and NATO should develop closer cooperation. It is believed that many Indian analysts harbour doubts about the possible implications for their country's international position should it develop closer ties with NATO. In a report published by NATO review it said, "The choice should be clear: exploiting NATO's potential as a forum for consultation and cooperation is a 'win-win' situation, both for India and for the Alliance."

Israel

Israel was designated as a major non-NATO ally in 1987 by US President Ronald Reagan and has since cooperated with NATO in the areas of technology, counterterrorism and other areas.

Japan
Cooperation between Japan and NATO began in 1990, and Japan was one of the first "partners across the globe" when the relationship became more formalized. Japan deepened their relationship in April 2013 with a joint political declaration, and in May 2014 signed accords relating to counter-terrorism and counter-piracy efforts. Japan has also been involved in the NATO-led International Security Assistance Force in Afghanistan and with stabilization efforts in the Balkans during the 1990s.

On June 29 2022, Prime Minister of Japan attended the NATO Summit for first time, as the trans-Atlantic alliance seeks to deepen ties with Asia-Pacific partners amid China's rise.

South Korea

South Korea is a global NATO partner and major non-NATO ally which has cooperated with NATO in multiple areas. For example, South Korea contributed substantially to rebuilding efforts after the 2001 war in Afghanistan. South Korea has also worked with NATO in the areas of non-proliferation and anti-WMD initiatives, advanced scientific and technology research as well as taken measures to ensure interoperability with NATO forces, including through joint exercises with NATO member countries through events such as RIMPAC and participation at NATO leadership meetings.

Mongolia
The NATO–Mongolia Individual Partnership and Cooperation Programme was approved on 19 March 2012. It is the first application of the new policy for flexible partnerships with global partners. Mongolia has worked with NATO on initiatives relating to interoperability, military modernization and officer training, as well as provided troops to support NATO's operations in Afghanistan from 2009-2014. More recently, Mongolia has been working together with NATO on Science for Peace and Security Programme, which focuses on cybersecurity and reducing the environmental impact of military sites.

New Zealand
In 2001, NATO and New Zealand signalled their commitment to strengthen cooperation with the joint signature of an Individual Partnership and Cooperation Programme in June 2012. New Zealand has made valuable contributions to NATO-led efforts in Afghanistan, as part of the International Security Assistance Force and Resolute Support missions to train, advise and assist the Afghan security forces and institutions.

Pakistan

Pakistan is a major non-NATO ally, cooperating in several main sectors: fighting insurgency and terrorism in Bosnia and Herzegovina and Afghanistan, military cooperation, transportation and logistics operations support to Afghanistan, and non-proliferation.

See also
Enlargement of NATO
Euro-Atlantic Partnership Council
European Union–NATO relations
Individual Partnership Action Plan
Major non-NATO ally – designated by the United States government
NATO open door policy
Partnership for Peace
Withdrawal from NATO

Notes

References

Nato
Politics of NATO